Michelle Langstone (born 30 January 1979) is a New Zealand actress who has been in many films and television series over the years in both New Zealand, and in Australia. She starred as Dr. Katherine "Kat" Manx in the television series Power Rangers S.P.D., and later appeared as Master Guin in Power Rangers Jungle Fury. She also featured as Livia in 2008 action fiction series Legend of The Seeker.

Filmography

Film

Television

References

External links
 

Living people
1979 births
New Zealand actresses
New Zealand film actresses
New Zealand television actresses
New Zealand soap opera actresses
20th-century New Zealand actresses
21st-century New Zealand actresses